Dirt, Silver and Gold is a 1976 compilation album by The Nitty Gritty Dirt Band that contains some of the band's greatest material to that point. It also includes 12 songs not previously available. It was originally released as a three LP album, and was released in 2003 as a two compact disc set by BGO Records.

The original release reached 77 on the US Charts and 28 on the US Country Charts.

The album' outer cover opens up to a picture of an elaborately painted safe door from the Ute City Banque in Aspen, Colorado. The original album had a four foot by two foot poster of the safe. The inside cover has pictures of the band in its three incarnations to that point, 1966–67, 1968–69 and 1970–76. The inner sleeves also had artwork. One side has tools for mining gold and a 45 record with a mountain on the label. The other side had a poster for the Society Of California Pioneers. The liner notes were written over these images on two of the sleeves.

Track listing

Disc one
LP side 1
"Buy For Me The Rain"  (Copeland/Noonan) – 2:23 – recorded December 1966from The Nitty Gritty Dirt Band
"Melissa"  (Jackson Browne) – 2:18 – recorded December 1966from The Nitty Gritty Dirt Band
"Collegiana"  (McHugh/Fields) – 2:34 – recorded December 1967from Rare Junk
"Mournin' Blues"  (Sbarbaro) – 3:47 – recorded December 1967from Rare Junk
"Willie The Weeper"  (Rymal/Melrose/Bloom) – 2:22 – recorded January 1968from Rare Junk
LP side 2
"Uncle Charlie Interview" – 1:39 – recorded November 1968from Uncle Charlie & His Dog Teddy
"Mr. Bojangles"  (Jerry Jeff Walker) – 3:25 – recorded November 1969from Uncle Charlie & His Dog Teddy
"Some Of Shelly's Blues"  (Nesmith) – 3:02 – recorded August 1969from Uncle Charlie & His Dog Teddy
"The Cure"  (Jeff Hanna) – 2:04 – recorded September 1969from Uncle Charlie & His Dog Teddy
"House At Pooh Corner"  (Kenny Loggins) – 2:37 – recorded October 1969from Uncle Charlie & His Dog Teddy
"Randy Lynn Rag"  (Earl Scruggs) – 1:46 – recorded November 1969from Uncle Charlie & His Dog Teddy
"Clemente Opus 36 (John)"  (John McEuen) – 1:40 – recorded April 1970from Uncle Charlie & His Dog Teddy
"Livin' Without You"  (Newman) – 2:01 – recorded May 1970from Uncle Charlie & His Dog Teddy
LP side 3
"Sixteen Tracks"  (Hanna/Jimmy Ibbotson) – 5:11 – recorded August 1971from All the Good Times
"Fish Song"  (Jimmy Fadden) – 4:26 – recorded June 1971from All the Good Times
"Creepin' Round Your Back Door"  (Fadden) – 2:52 – recorded September 1971from All the Good Times
"Honky Tonkin'"  (Hank Williams) – 2:24 – recorded August 1971from Will the Circle Be Unbroken
"Togary Mountain"  (McEuen) – 2:27 – recorded August 1971from Will the Circle Be Unbroken
"Soldier's Joy"  (Scruggs/McEuen) – 2:09 – recorded August 1971from Will the Circle Be Unbroken

Disc two
LP side 4
"Ripplin' Waters"  (Ibbotson) – 5:49 – recorded February 1975from Symphonion Dream
"You Are My Flower"  (A.P. Carter) 3:34 – recorded August 1971from Will the Circle Be Unbroken
"The Battle of New Orleans"  (Jimmie Driftwood)  3:21 – recorded January 1973from Symphonion Dream
"All I Have To Do Is Dream"  (Felice and Boudleaux Bryant) – 3:49 – recorded February 1975from Symphonion Dream
"Rocky Top"  (Bryant/Bryant) – 2:12 – recorded February 1975Previously unreleased
"Gavotte No. 2"  (Arranged by McEuen) – 1:34 – recorded June 1976Previously unreleased
LP side 5
"Jamaica Lady"  (Holster) – 4:12 – recorded June 1976Previously unreleased
"Mother Earth (Provides For Me)"  (Kaz) – 3:26 – recorded June 1976Previously unreleased
"Falling Down Slow"  (Fadden) – 3:13 – recorded June 1976Previously unreleased
"Bowleg's"  (Hanna) – 4:13 – recorded June 1976Previously unreleased
"Doc's Guitar"  (Doc Watson) – 1:32 – recorded June 1976Previously unreleased
LP side 6
"Bayou Jubilee/Sally Was A Goodun"  (Hanna/McEuen/Fadden/Ibbotson) – 3:03 – recorded  February 1975from Symphonion Dream
"Cosmic Cowboy, Part 1"  (Murphey) – 3:58 – recorded June 1976Previously unreleased
"Win Or Lose"  (McEuen) – 3:35 – recorded June 1976Previously unreleased
"Woody Woodpecker"  (Tiddles/Idriss) – 1:09 – recorded April 1973Previously unreleased
"Visiting An Old Friend"  (Kelly) – 1:53 – recorded June 1976Previously unreleased
"Will the Circle Be Unbroken"  (Carter) – 4:51 – recorded August 1971from Will the Circle Be Unbroken
"Foggy Mountain Breakdown"  (Scruggs) – 2:36 – recorded August 1971Previously unreleased

Personnel
The Dirt Band 1966–1967
Ralph Barr
Jimmie Fadden
Jeff Hanna
Bruce Kunkle
Les Thompson
John McEuen
The Dirt Band 1968–1969
John McEuen
Jimmie Fadden
Jeff Hanna
Chris Darrow
Les Thompson
Ralph Barr
The Dirt Band 1970–1976
Jeff Hanna
John McEuen
Jimmie Fadden
Les Thompson
Jim Ibbotson
Jackie Clark
John Cable
Contributing Players
Jim Gordon
Russ Kunkel
Byron Berline
Johnny Sandlin
Michel Rubini
Maury Manseau
Earl, Gery and Randy Scruggs
Norman Blake
Vassar Clements
Doc Watson
Roy "Junior" Huskey
Bernie Mysior
Bobby Carpenter
Bobby Mason
Brian Savage
David James Holster
Hayden Gregg
Will The Circle Be Unbroken vocalists
Mother Maybelle Carter
Jimmy Martin
Roy Acuff

Production
Production, art direction, design – William McEuen

References
Information from LP or CD liner notes, unless otherwise noted.

Nitty Gritty Dirt Band albums
1976 compilation albums
Liberty Records compilation albums